Sofiivka may refer to:

 Sofiivka, Dnipropetrovsk Oblast, Ukraine
 Sofiivka, Kramatorsk urban hromada, Kramatorsk Raion, Donetsk Oblast, Donetsk Oblast, Ukraine
 Karlo-Marksove, Donetsk Oblast, Ukraine, renamed Sofiivka by Ukrainian authorities 
 Sofiyivka Park, Uman, Ukraine